Fairfield Township may refer to the following places in the U.S. state of Ohio:

Fairfield Township, Butler County, Ohio
Fairfield Township, Columbiana County, Ohio
Fairfield Township, Highland County, Ohio
Fairfield Township, Huron County, Ohio
Fairfield Township, Madison County, Ohio
Fairfield Township, Tuscarawas County, Ohio
Fairfield Township, Washington County, Ohio

See also
Fairfield Township (disambiguation)

Ohio township disambiguation pages